The Division of Fairfax is an Australian Electoral Division in Queensland.

Geography
Since 1984, federal electoral division boundaries in Australia have been determined at redistributions by a redistribution committee appointed by the Australian Electoral Commission. Redistributions occur for the boundaries of divisions in a particular state, and they occur every seven years, or sooner if a state's representation entitlement changes or when divisions of a state are malapportioned.

History 

The division was created in 1984 and is named after Ruth Fairfax, founder of the Country Women's Association. It is located in the Sunshine Coast region north of Brisbane and includes the towns of Coolum, Yaroomba, Marcoola, Mudjimba, Maroochydore, Buderim, Woombye, Bli Bli, Yandina, Nambour, Mapleton, Kenilworth and Eumundi.

While the Sunshine Coast is traditionally a conservative area, Fairfax is located in a particularly conservative portion of the Sunshine Coast, and so has always been held by a centre-right party.   Originally a safe seat for the National Party, demographic change has made it equally safe for the Liberal Party. 

The electorate came to national attention at the 2013 federal election, when Clive Palmer, the founder of the Palmer United Party, narrowly won it by 53 votes.  Before then, the Coalition's hold on the seat had only been seriously threatened twice, in 1998 and 2007. At all other times, it was a safe, or fairly safe, Coalition seat. 

Palmer did not run for re-election, and it was widely expected that the seat would revert to the merged Liberal National Party because, in 2013, LNP would have retained it easily in a "traditional" two-party-preferred vote contest with Labor.  As expected, Palmer's 2013 opponent, Ted O'Brien, won the seat resoundingly at the 2016 federal election and has held it without serious difficulty since.

Members

Election results

References

External links
 Division of Fairfax (Qld) — Australian Electoral Commission

Electoral divisions of Australia
Constituencies established in 1984
1984 establishments in Australia
Federal politics in Queensland
Sunshine Coast, Queensland